Joseph Cale Gundy (born April 10, 1972) is a former American football quarterback who played for the Oklahoma Sooners from 1990 to 1993.  While at Oklahoma he was a member of Delta Tau Delta International Fraternity. From 1999 until his resignation in 2022, he was an assistant at his alma mater, first as running backs coach and later serving as the team's offensive coordinator and recruiting coordinator while coaching inside receivers. In 2022, he was named coach of the wide receivers unit as a whole.

Gundy resigned his position on the coaching staff on August 7, 2022

Family
His brother, Mike, is the head football coach at Oklahoma State University.

References

External links
 Oklahoma Sooners bio

1972 births
Living people
American football quarterbacks
Oklahoma Sooners football coaches
Oklahoma Sooners football players
UAB Blazers football coaches
People from Midwest City, Oklahoma
Sportspeople from Oklahoma County, Oklahoma